Diane Parry (born 1 September 2002) is a French professional tennis player. On 24 October 2022, she peaked at No. 58 in the WTA singles rankings. On 27 February 2023, she peaked at No. 176 in the doubles rankings. She was the junior world No. 1 in 2019.

Career

Junior years
Grand Slam results - Singles:
 Australian Open: 1R (2018)
 French Open: 2R (2019)
 Wimbledon: SF (2019)
 US Open: 2R (2018)

Grand Slam results - Doubles:
 Australian Open: 1R (2018)
 French Open: SF (2019)
 Wimbledon: QF (2018)
 US Open: QF (2019)
Parry has a career-high ITF junior combined ranking of world No. 1, attained on 21 October 2019. She was designated ITF Junior World Champion for 2019.

2017: WTA Tour debut
She made her WTA Tour main-draw debut at the French Open thanks to a wildcard, partnering Giulia Morlet; they were defeated by the 13th-seeded pair of Kiki Bertens and Johanna Larsson, in two sets in the first round.

Parry won her first ITF Circuit tournament in Hammamet, Tunisia, partnering Yasmine Mansouri.

2018-19: Grand Slam debut
She made her Grand Slam singles debut at the 2018 French Open, entering the qualifying event as a wildcard, where she upset No. 5 seed, Jana Fett, in the first round before losing to Rebecca Šramková in the second.

Parry made her Grand Slam singles main-draw debut at the 2019 French Open as a wildcard, losing in the second round to No. 20 seed Elise Mertens after having won against Vera Lapko in the first. Later that year, she also made her US Open debut as a wildcard, losing in the first round against Kristýna Plíšková.

2020-21: First WTA 125 title
In 2020, Parry won her first ITF Circuit singles title in Antalya, Turkey against Berfu Cengiz in the final.

In 2021, Parry won three additional ITF tournaments, in Périgueux, France, Turin, Italy, and Seville, Spain, bringing her perfect record to 4–0 in ITF Circuit finals.

She reached her first final on the WTA Challenger Tour at the Argentine Open, losing 3–6, 3–6 to Anna Bondar. Two weeks later, she won her first WTA 125 tournament at the Montevideo Open, winning the final 6–3, 6–2 against Panna Udvardy.

2022: French Open third round, first top-3 major win, top 60
She made her top 100 debut on 28 February 2022 after her debut at the Australian Open as a wildcard.

Parry made the second round at the French Open defeating defending champion and world No. 2, Barbora Krejčíková, her first career match against a top-10 player and a top-50 player. Next, she defeated Camila Osorio to reach the third round of a Grand Slam for the first time in her career. She lost to Sloane Stephens in the third round.

On 24 October 2022, Parry reached a career-high WTA ranking of No. 58.

2023: Second Australian Open wildcard, Maiden WTA title in doubles 
Playing at the  Mérida Open with Caty McNally, she won her maiden doubles title, beating Wang Xinyu and Wu Fang-hsien in the final.

Playing style
Parry plays with a one-handed backhand which has created comparisons to Amélie Mauresmo.

Performance timelines

Only main-draw results in WTA Tour, Grand Slam tournaments, Fed Cup/Billie Jean King Cup and Olympic Games are included in win–loss records.

Singles
Current through the 2022 Australian Open.

Doubles

WTA career finals

Doubles: 1 (title)

WTA Challenger finals

Singles: 2 (1 title, 1 runner-up)

ITF Circuit finals

Singles: 4 (4 titles)

Doubles: 3 (3 titles)

Top 10 wins

Notes

References

External links
 
 
 

2002 births
Living people
French female tennis players
Tennis players at the 2018 Summer Youth Olympics